Conchita Martínez was the defending champion, but did not compete this year.

Sandra Cecchini won the title by defeating Emanuela Zardo 6–2, 6–1 in the final.

Seeds

Draw

Finals

Top half

Bottom half

References

External links
 Official results archive (ITF)
 Official results archive (WTA)

Clarins Open
1992 WTA Tour